The Portrait of Pope Pius VII is an 1805 portrait of Pope Pius VII by the French painter Jacques-Louis David to thank the pope for assisting at the coronation of Napoleon I of France. Pope Pius appears in David's The Coronation of Napoleon, depicted as blessing the emperor, when in fact he was merely a spectator, assisting at the ceremony with a resigned expression throughout.

History
The painting seems to have been commissioned by Count Charles Fleurieu, Quartermaster General for the French emperor, though no written mention of a commission survives. It was painted at the Tuileries around the end of February 1805 from life. David seems to have been won over and impressed by Pius's simplicity and deep humanity, choosing to show him in an introspective pose rather than as the most powerful prelate in Christianity. He was paid 10,000 francs for his work and the portrait was exhibited in the Gallery of the French Senate at its seat in the Château du Luxembourg and then assigned to the Musée Napoléon (now known as the Louvre). It was displayed again at the Château in 1824 before being returned to its permanent home in the Louvre in 1827.

David produced three copies of the portrait, assisted by one of his students (probably Georges Rouget), two of which were commissioned by Napoleon for the Musée de Fontainebleau and for the Musée du Château de Versailles. David held onto the third copy and took it with him during his exile to Brussels, and which is now lost.

Description 
Vertical in format and with a brown background, the painting shows Pius three-quarter-length seated on a red velvet chair embroidered in gold. He has a peaceful expression and wears a white zucchetto, a white rochet or tunic (of which only the sleeves can be seen), a red velvet pelerine-type camail with ermine cuffs and a red stole with gold embroidery. Pius's arms rest on the chair's arms and his right hand holds a paper on which is written in Latin Pio VII Bonarium Artium Patron (Pius VII, Patron of the Fine Arts). The painting is signed top left with LUD. DAVID PARISIIS 1805.

Pius VII
1805 paintings
Pius VII
Paintings in the Louvre by French artists
Pius VII
Pius VII
Pope Pius VII